"Pussy Print" (censored on the album as "P**** Print") is a song by American rapper Gucci Mane featuring fellow American rapper Kanye West, from the former's ninth studio album Everybody Looking (2016). The track samples the 1996 song "Rundgang um die transzendentale säule der singularität" by black metal artist Burzum throughout.

Commercial performance
Upon the release of the featuring album, "Pussy Print" debuted at its peak of number 89 on the US Billboard Hot 100.

Charts

References

Gucci Mane songs
Kanye West songs
Songs written by Gucci Mane
Songs written by Kanye West
Song recordings produced by Mike Will Made It
Dirty rap songs
Songs written by Mike Will Made It
2016 songs
Songs written by Swae Lee